Clint du Plessis (born 12 December 1975) is a South African cricketer. He played in seven first-class and five List A matches from 1995/96 to 2000/01.

References

External links
 

1975 births
Living people
South African cricketers
Eastern Province cricketers
North West cricketers
Cricketers from Cape Town